George Bandy (February 7, 1945 – January 16, 2018) was an American Baptist minister and politician.

Bandy lived in Opelika, Alabama. He received his bachelor's degree from Morehouse College. Bandy served as the pastor of the Saint James Missionary Baptist Church in Opelika, Alabama. He served on the Opelika City Council and was the president pro tempore. Bandy also served on the Lee County Commission. Bandy served in the Alabama House of Representatives from the 83rd District, from 1994 until his death in 2018. Bandy was involved with the Democrat and served as chairman of the Alabama Democratic Conference.
Bandy died on January 16, 2018, in a hospital in Macon, Georgia.

References

1945 births
2018 deaths
People from Opelika, Alabama
Morehouse College alumni
Baptist ministers from the United States
County commissioners in Alabama
Alabama city council members
Democratic Party members of the Alabama House of Representatives
21st-century American politicians
Baptists from Alabama